Rhinocerocephalus is an extinct genus of dicynodont synapsid from the Middle Triassic of the Orenburg Oblast from Russia.

See also

 List of therapsids

References

 The main groups of non-mammalian synapsids at Mikko's Phylogeny Archive

Dicynodonts
Triassic synapsids
Extinct animals of Russia
Fossil taxa described in 1969